Pang Yongying (traditional chinese:龐永英,Simplified:庞永英,born 6 June 1964) is a Chinese sport shooter who competed in the 1992 Summer Olympics.

References

1964 births
Living people
Chinese male sport shooters
ISSF rifle shooters
Olympic shooters of China
Shooters at the 1992 Summer Olympics
20th-century Chinese people